Ivan Šarić or Ivan Saric may refer to:

 Ivan Šarić (archbishop)  (1871–1960), Roman Catholic Archbishop of Vrhbosna, Bosnia and Herzegovina
 Ivan Šarić (chess player) (born 1990), Croatian chess player
 Ivan Šarić (footballer) (born 2001), Croatian football player
 Ivan Šarić (comedian) (born 1985), Croatian comedian who hosted the TV show Hrvatska traži zvijezdu
 Ivan Šarić (politician), head of the Central Bosnia Canton, 1996–97
 Ivan Sarić (1876–1966), sportsman and inventor from Subotica